Raphael, formerly Richard, Rakowski (born 1952) is an American entrepreneur, investor and health care and energy consultant. He  has had a 30-year career in sales engineering, process control consulting, and entrepreneurial start ups in health care services and renewable energy. He is a public speaker and advocate for changes to the American health care system.
He is the subject of a documentary film examining the effects of the Holocaust on his childhood.

Life and career

Raphael Rakowski graduated from Lehman College in 1973 with a bachelor's degree in political science. He then served as a Rotary Foundation ambassador of good will in Germany, where he studied the Holocaust.
He began his career in Honeywell as a sales engineer. He then became an operations consultant to Fortune 100 clients in North America, South America and Europe working with over 100 manufacturing and distribution facilities.

From 1980 to 1986, Rakowski provided strategic and operating consulting services for Fortune 500 manufacturing companies.

In 1986, he launched Evan Kristen Specialty Foods, which developed technology for washing, cutting and packaging fresh produce.

From 1989 to 1992, Rakowski was a partner at Marketing Corporation of America (now the Growth Platforms Institute, a part of the Interpublic Group), where he provided marketing counsel to Fortune 100 companies.

In 1992, he founded and led New Paradigm Ventures (NPV), a consulting and investment firm in the health care and food industry market. A study conducted by NPV on medical outcomes improvement resulted in the care enhancement strategy that Mr. Rakowski brought to American Healthways to respond to perceived gaps in the U.S. health care system. During his tenure, Healthways stock grew from $18 per share to a non-split-adjusted $53 per share on a roughly 10% increase in volume.
New Paradigm Ventures developed new business ventures in conjunction with international brands such as Campbell Soup Company and General Nutrition Centers.

He served as President of American Healthways (now Healthways, Inc.), a large market cap health care company based in Nashville, TN, which serves the needs of patients with chronic and acute health conditions.

He founded Klinger Advanced Aesthetics (now Cosmedicine Companies), a company that focused on bringing medicinal clinical trials research to the beauty products market. His work in health care and aesthetics has been featured in the New York Times, Wall Street Journal, Time Magazine, and other media outlets.

In 2007, he founded Intersection, LLC, a company that develops and funds new business strategies in the health care and renewable energy fields and c-India, a new company designed to bring best practice clinical research to India while supporting Indian public health initiatives.

In 2010, Rakowski led a team of engineers and clinicians in the creation of Clinically Home, the first commercially scalable model to enable safe hospitalization at home. A published clinical trial in 2015 validated the model. In 2017, Raphael and his team created a next-gen version of Clinically Home called Medically Home and joined forces with Atrius Health to bring the Program to market, where patients are being treated with the model today. In 2020, after his role as CEO and Founder, Raphael was named Executive Chairman of Medically Home Group, Inc. Medically Home operates in five states with a large number of strategic partners. He is a frequent speaker at healthcare events including the Digital Health Summit at CES in Las Vegas.

Rakowski and his father were featured in the documentary film Mr. Rakowski, which premiered at the International Documentary Film Festival Amsterdam and examines the effects of the Holocaust on his childhood and their relationship.

See also
Health care

Notes and references

External links 
 Intersection, LLC
 Cosmedicine Companies
 Healthways, Inc.

American chief executives
Living people
1950s births
Lehman College alumni